Michael M. Lehane (April 15, 1865 – February 28, 1903) was an American first baseman in Major League Baseball. He played for the Columbus Solons of the American Association during the 1890 and 1891 seasons. Lehane also played in the minor leagues from 1887 to 1896. He died from chronic nephritis.

References

External links

1865 births
1903 deaths
19th-century baseball players
Major League Baseball first basemen
Columbus Solons players
Buffalo Bisons (minor league) players
Binghamton Bingoes players
Springfield Ponies players
Springfield Maroons players
Hartford Bluebirds players
Baseball players from New York (state)
Burials at Calvary Cemetery (Queens)